Tisili is a former city and diocese of in Roman Africa; it is now a Catholic titular see in modern Tunisia, with its precise location not being defined.

History 
Tisili was important enough in the Roman province of Africa proconsularis to become a suffragan bishopric of its capital Carthage's Metropolitan Archbishopric. It was however to fade with the city.

Titular see 
The diocese was nominally restored as a titular bishopric in 1933.

It has had the following incumbents, all of the lowest (episcopal) class :
 Américo Henriques (1966.07.03 – 1971.02.02), as Auxiliary Bishop of Lamego (Portugal) (1966.07.03 – 1967.04.15) and Coadjutor Bishop of Lamego (1967.04.15 – 1971.02.02); later succeeded as Bishop of Lamego (Portugal) (1971.02.02 – 1972.02.19), Bishop of Nova Lisboa (Angola) (1972.02.19 – 1976.04.13)
 José Manuel Estepa Llaurens, (1972.09.05 – 1983.07.30), as Auxiliary Bishop of Madrid (Spain) (1972.09.05 – 1983.07.30); later Archbishop Military Vicar of Spain (Spain) (1983.07.30 – 1986.07.21), Titular Archbishop of Velebusdus (1983.07.30 – 1989.11.18), promoted Archbishop Military Ordinary of Spain (Spain) (1986.07.21 – 2003.10.30), Titular Archbishop of Italica (1989.11.18 – 1998.03.07), created Cardinal-Priest of S. Gabriele Arcangelo all’Acqua Traversa (2010.11.20 [2011.04.29] – ...)
 Oscar Angel Bernal (1986.01.23 – 1988.06.18), as Auxiliary Bishop of Sonsón–Rionegro (Colombia) (1986.01.23 – 1988.06.18); later Bishop of Girardota (Colombia) (1988.06.18 – 1996.07.04)
 Hans-Jochen Jaschke (1988.11.18 – ...), Auxiliary Bishop of Hamburg (Germany)

See also 
 Tišīlī (تشيلي), Arabic name for Chile

References

External links 
 GCatholic, with titular incumbent biography links

Catholic titular sees in Africa
Former Roman Catholic dioceses in Africa